Wootton Wawen railway station serves the village of Wootton Wawen in Warwickshire, England. It is served by trains between Birmingham and Stratford-upon-Avon.

The station was renamed from Wootton Wawen Platform to Wootton Wawen on 6 May 1974.  Under British Rail, the station was threatened with closure in 1985 (along with the line between Henley-in-Arden and Bearley Junction). The plans were dropped in 1987 and the line remains open.

Services
It is a request stop: passengers wishing to board a train here must signal to the driver; those wishing to alight must inform the train conductor.

A normal service operates on most Bank holidays.

References

External links

Historical photographs at www.warwickshirerailways.com
Rail Around Birmingham and the West Midlands: Wootton Wawen station

Railway stations in Warwickshire
DfT Category F2 stations
Former Great Western Railway stations
Railway stations in Great Britain opened in 1908
Railway stations served by West Midlands Trains
Railway request stops in Great Britain
1908 establishments in England